Felipe Campanholi Martins, sometimes known as just Felipe (born 30 September 1990), is a Brazilian professional footballer who plays as a midfielder for Orlando City of Major League Soccer.

Career

Beginnings

After beginning his career with small clubs in Rio de Janeiro, Felipe Martins signed with Italian club Padova in 2008. However, because of a minor heart defect, he was released. After expressing an interest to play in England, Felipe had a successful trial with AFC Bournemouth which played in League One during the 2007–2008 season, and was offered a contract. Eddie Howe, then manager of Bournemouth said, "He's got great talent and great feet and can certainly cross a ball. I've taken a long-term view and you've got to look to the future".

Despite the strong interest from Bournemouth, Felipe Martins opted to join FC Winterthur in Switzerland in January 2009. His form with Winterthur brought Felipe to the attention of bigger Swiss clubs. At the end of the season, he joined FC Lugano and remained at the club for three seasons, scoring a total of seven goals in 50 games. In 2011, he was loaned out to FC Wohlen, where he tallied two goals in 15 games.

Montreal Impact
Felipe Martins signed with expansion side Montreal Impact of Major League Soccer on 21 December 2011. In his first season with Montreal he appeared in 30 league games scoring 4 goals and led the Impact with 10 assists. His first MLS goal came in a 2–0 victory over Sporting Kansas City on 5 May 2012. He would miss the final two matches of the season due to surgery for a sports related hernia. Felipe had a solid 2013 season in which he appeared in 32 league matches scoring 5 goals and 8 assists. He helped the club capture the 2013 Canadian Championship scoring Montreal's first goal in a 2–2 draw against Vancouver Whitecaps on 29 May 2013. Felipe made his CONCACAF Champions League debut in August and featured in three of Montreal's group stage matches. In September 2013, Felipe was listed 13th in the MLS' 24 under 24 series, which ranked the league's top young players. Felipe continued his fine play for Montreal during the 2014 season as he appeared in 31 league matches scoring 3 goals and 6 assists. His goal in second half stoppage time of the second leg of the  2014 Canadian Championship final against Toronto FC  at Stade Saputo on 4 June 2014 gave Montreal a 2–1 aggregate victory and a second consecutive Canadian Championship. Felipe was a part of the Impact squad that made the 2015 CONCACAF Champions League Finals but only participated in the group stage as he was traded to the New York Red Bulls before the knock-out rounds.

New York Red Bulls
On 27 January 2015 it was announced that Felipe Martins had been traded to New York Red Bulls along with the top spot in the allocation order from the Montreal Impact, in exchange for Eric Alexander, Ambroise Oyongo, and an international player spot. Felipe reunited with his former Montreal manager, Jesse Marsch. The following day New York used the newly acquired top allocation ranking to sign midfielder Sacha Kljestan. Felipe made his debut for New York on 8 March 2015 appearing as a starter in a 1–1 draw at Sporting Kansas City. On 26 April 2015 Felipe scored his first goal for New York in a 1–1 draw against the LA Galaxy. On 9 August 2015 Felipe scored his second goal of the season in a 2–0 derby victory over New York City FC. On 20 September 2015 Felipe opened the scoring for New York with a 40-yard blast in a 2–0 victory  over  Portland Timbers. Felipe finished the season playing in every game during the Red Bulls campaign, including 34 league matches, 3 Open Cup matches and 4 MLS Cup matches. His consistent play in the midfield with partners, Sacha Kljestan and Dax McCarty lead New York to their second Supporters' Shield in three years.

On 19 March 2016, Felipe Martins helped New York to a come from behind victory over Houston Dynamo, scoring the equalizing goal in the 78th minute on a strike from 20 yards out and netting the game winner on a free kick minutes later in the 4–3 victory. Three days later, Felipe was named as the MLS Player of the Week for his performance. On 29 April 2016, Felipe helped New York to a 4–0 victory against FC Dallas scoring his third goal of the season and providing an assist. Felipe scored his fourth of the season on 13 July 2016 in a 2–0 victory over Orlando City SC. Felipe was named to the CONCACAF Champions League round one team of the week for his performance against Antigua GFC on 3 August.

On 19 July 2017, Felipe Martins scored his first goal of the season for New York in a 5–1 victory over San Jose Earthquakes.

Vancouver Whitecaps FC 
On 2 March 2018 it was announced that Felipe had been traded to Vancouver Whitecaps FC, along with $500,000 in Transfer Allocation Money (TAM) and an international roster spot, in exchange for Tim Parker.

D.C. United 
On 6 August 2019, Felipe Martins was traded to D.C. United in exchange for $75,000 in Targeted Allocation Money and an international roster spot. His debut was in a 2–1 win against LA Galaxy on 11 August 2019. Felipe tore his ACL in his right knee during practice on 1 September 2020, and is expected to be sidelined for 9 months. Felipe's contract option was declined by D.C. United on 30 November 2020, but he was re-signed by the club on 25 January 2021.

Orlando City 
On 22 November 2022, Felipe joined Orlando City as a free agent, signing a one-year contract with a club option year.

International
Felipe Martins has not represented Brazil, his country of birth, at any level. Felipe was reportedly considering representing Canada internationally and applied for permanent residency, but without gaining full citizenship he could not appear for the Canadian national team.

Career statistics

Honours
Montreal Impact
Canadian Championship: 2013, 2014

New York Red Bulls
MLS Supporters' Shield: 2015

References

External links
 
 

1990 births
Living people
Association football midfielders
Brazilian footballers
Brazilian expatriate footballers
Brazilian expatriate sportspeople in Canada
Brazilian expatriate sportspeople in the United States
Calcio Padova players
New York Red Bulls players
Vancouver Whitecaps FC players
D.C. United players
Austin FC players
Expatriate footballers in Italy
Expatriate footballers in Switzerland
Expatriate soccer players in Canada
Expatriate soccer players in the United States
FC Winterthur players
FC Wohlen players
Major League Soccer players
CF Montréal players
Sportspeople from Paraná (state)
Orlando City SC players